Dindica polyphaenaria is a moth of the family Geometridae first described by Achille Guenée in 1857. It is found in Taiwan, the Himalayas, south-east Asia and Sundaland.

The wingspan is 45–52 mm.

The larvae feed on the young foliage of Litsea species. They are leaf green with subdorsal yellow-white and lateral white lines over the abdominal segments and with obscure, oblique white lines between them. There is also a narrowish yellow ventral stripe with similar oblique yellow lines between it and the lateral line. Pupation takes place in a folded and spun together leaf.

References

Pseudoterpnini
Moths of Asia
Fauna of the Himalayas
Moths described in 1857
Taxa named by Achille Guenée